VIB Sports is a Bahraini women's road bicycle racing team which participates in elite women's races. The team was established in 2019.

Team roster

References

External links

UCI Women's Teams
Cycling teams based in Bahrain
Cycling teams established in 2019